Võipere is a village in Kadrina Parish, Lääne-Viru County, in northeastern Estonia.

Painter Arnold Akberg (1894–1984) is born in this village.

References

Villages in Lääne-Viru County